This article lists the winners and nominees for the Black Reel Award for Television for Outstanding Supporting Actor, Comedy Series. This category was first introduced in 2017 and won by Tituss Burgess for Unbreakable Kimmy Schmidt. Burgess & Thompson are currently tied with most wins in this category wins with 2. Jay Ellis & Laurence Fishburne are currently tied as the most nominated actor with 4 nominations.

Winners and nominees
Winners are listed first and highlighted in bold.

2010s

2020s

Superlatives

Programs with multiple awards

2 awards
 Saturday Night Live
 Unbreakable Kimmy Schmidt

Performers with multiple awards

2 awards
 Tituss Burgess 
 Kenan Thompson (consecutive)

Programs with multiple nominations

5 nominations
 Black-ish

4 nominations 
 Insecure

3 nominations
 Saturday Night Live
 Unbreakable Kimmy Schmidt

2 nominations
 Atlanta
 Brooklyn Nine-Nine

Performers with multiple nominations

4 nominations
 Jay Ellis
 Laurence Fishburne

3 nominations
 Tituss Burgess
 Kenan Thompson

2 nominations
 LaKeith Stanfield

Total awards by network
 NBC - 2
 Netflix - 2
 FX - 1

References

Black Reel Awards